Ulysses and the Golden Fleece is a graphic adventure game released in 1981 for the Apple II. It was created by Bob Davis and Ken Williams. With a graphic at the top of the game screen, the player navigates the game via a two-word command parser. The game was ported to the Atari 8-bit family, Commodore 64, and IBM PC.

Reception 
PC Magazine rated Ulysses 14.0 out of a total of 18 points. It called the graphics "gorgeous", but noted the limited text parser compared to Infocoms Infidel.

References

External links 

1981 video games
Apple II games
Adventure games
Atari 8-bit family games
Commodore 64 games
Works based on the Odyssey
ScummVM-supported games
Sierra Entertainment games
Video games based on works by Homer
Video games developed in the United States